Tokimeki Memorial Girl's Side: 3rd Story is the 2010 sequel to Tokimeki Memorial Girl's Side: 2nd Kiss and the seventh main game in Konami's Tokimeki Memorial dating sim series. An enhanced port to the PlayStation Portable featuring additional content and titled Tokimeki Memorial Girl's Side Premium ~3rd Story~ was released in 2012. This game was the first game in the Tokimeki Memorial Girl's Side sub-series to be released on PSP.

Game features
The game features all the additions that were made to the first two games in their DS versions, but adds new features like the 3P mode, where the main character can date two of the boys at the same time or the Pride vs Pride mode, where two boys in 3P mode will fight over the main character. The Premium version added a new character, Tatsuya, renewed graphics with a 2D animation system, and the "Boys' Life", mode, where the player can watch super-deformed versions of the main male characters interact with their bedrooms. This is also the first Girl's Side game where there isn't Rival Mode.

Game content
The main character is a student at Habataki High School, the same school as the first game, but it has recently changed buildings and uniforms (the game starts around the time the second game's protagonist graduates). While leading a normal high school life including academics, club activities and part-time work, it is also possible to become friendly with boys who can make a declaration of love on graduation day.

Legend
The legend of this game is that primroses are blessed by the fairies and that if the players make a wish, the primroses make it true. This story is told by a young boy to the protagonist as a young girl in the primrose garden next to the church (now abandoned) that was the confessing spot of the first game, while they are playing hide and seek with the young boy's brother. In her first day at school, the main character remembers that the two boys were the Sakurai brothers. There are also references to the church legend to the first game, and if the player pursues Tatsuya's route in Premium, the mermaid legend from the second game is also mentioned.

Characters

Male characters

CV : Tomokazu Sugita
One of the main male characters of the game and Kouichi's brother. He's extroverted and flirty, always jumping from high places and calling himself a "hero". He always hides his thoughts behind a smile. He works at the Annery flower shop.

CV : Jun'ichi Suwabe
The other main male character of the game and Ruka's brother. Despite his intimidating appearance, he cares deeply for his brother and the main character. He works at the gas station.

CV : Eiji Miyashita
The sporty boy of 3rd Story, he's one of the main character's classmates and started a Judo Club at Habataki High. The main character can become its manager if she hasn't joined any clubs at the point of meeting him. He works as a pool lifeguard.

CV : Atsushi Kisaichi
A boy one year younger than the main character that is interested in fashion. She can meet him when she goes out shopping on the first year, but she won't learn his name until he enrols into Habataki High, one year later than the main character. He's skilled at judo, and will join the Judo Club if the heroine is the manager. He also works at the convenience store.

CV : Susumu Chiba
He's the younger brother of Tamami Konno, one of the female characters of the first game. He's the student council president, and he's very kind and reliable. He shares many traits with Hikami from the second game, such as doing "greeting exercises" at the morning and riding a bike for going to school. He's a year older than the main character.

CV : Shinnosuke Tachibana
A genius pianist from a wealthy family. He tends to speak rudely and is unable to be honest about his feelings. He's a year older than the main character. He isn't part of any clubs, but he'll help the main character with her brass band practices if they're close.

CV : Mitsuhiro Ichiki
The main character's homeroom teacher. He's 24 years old, but looks much younger, a fact that amuses the main character's classmates. He isn't dateable, but he does have his own ending. He used to play rugby at university and is known for his cheerful demeanor.

CV : Yuuichi Iguchi
A "secret" character. A boy two years younger than the main character who can only be obtained if the main character becomes the manager of the Baseball Club, because he always sees their practices.

CV : Takeshi Kusao
Another "secret" character, he's the writer of an extremely popular romance series that he decided to leave unfinished. The main character can become a fan of his work and support him.

CV : Hisayoshi Suganuma
Another "secret" character, he's a classmate of the main character who doesn't have any special features and always falls into the background, and falls in love with the main character at first sight.

CV : Taiki Matsuno
The "secret" character of the PSP version, he's a student at Hanegasaki High. He works as a model, but actually he isn't very confident and wants to work in something related to the movie industry when he's older. The heroine meets him by visiting Alucard coffee shop in one of her free days.

Female characters

CV : Saori Goto
One of the main character's best friends, she assists the main character in the same way Tsukushi and Yuu did it in the two first games. She's strongly interested in fortune-telling and horoscopes and hates being mistaken for a child, but despite that she loves stuffed toys. She works at the Anastasia cake shop and is a member of the art club.

CV : Ami Koshimizu
One of the main character's best friends, she has a lot of knowledge in fashion due to her position as a member of the Hanatsubaki family. She has many fans, but she's afraid to get close to people because most of them are only interested in her family. She's a member of the volleyball club and works at Simone general store, owned by her relative Goro. She calls the main character "Bambi".

References

External links
 Official PSP version game site 

2010 video games
Japan-exclusive video games
Otome games
Dating sims
Nintendo DS games
PlayStation Portable games
Tokimeki Memorial
Video games developed in Japan
Video games scored by Akari Kaida